Szaniawski (feminine: Szaniawska, plural: Szaniawscy) is a Polish surname. Notable people with the surname include:

 Alfons Szaniawski (1837–1905), Russian general and activist
 Jerzy Szaniawski (1886–1970), Polish writer, playwright, and essayist
 Józef Kalasanty Szaniawski (1764–1843), Polish philosopher and politician

Polish-language surnames